These are the official results of the Men's 3000 metres steeplechase event at the 2001 IAAF World Championships in Edmonton, Canada. There were a total number of 25 participating athletes, with two qualifying heats and the final held on Wednesday 2001-08-08 at 20:00h.

Medalists

Records

Final

Heats
Held on Monday 2001-08-06

References
 

H
Steeplechase at the World Athletics Championships